Tingkem is a village in Blang Jerango district, Gayo Lues Regency in Aceh province, Indonesia. Its population is 215.

Climate
Tingkem has a cold subtropical highland climate (Cfb) with moderate to heavy rainfall year-round.

References

 Populated places in Aceh